Dvin Artashat, is a defunct Armenian football club from Artashat, Ararat Province. It was founded in 1982 under the name Olympia Artashat. After the independence of Armenia, the club participated in the domestic competitions under the name FC Artashat, between 1992 and 1993. In 1995, the club was renamed FC Dvin Artashat. However, after the 1999 Armenian Premier League season, the club was dissolved and is currently inactive from any professional football in Armenia.

League Record

References
RSSSF Armenia (and subpages per year)

Defunct football clubs in Armenia
1982 establishments in Armenia
1999 disestablishments in Armenia